Vice admiral Sir Eric George Anderson Clifford,  (3 September 1900 – 7 September 1964) was a Royal Navy officer who served as Deputy Chief of the Naval Staff from 1954 to 1957.

Early life and education
Clifford was born in Hove, Sussex, the son of Captain William Trannock Clifford RNR of Poplar and his wife, Clara Strutt, born in Cape Colony. Like his father, Clifford was educated at the Thames Nautical Training College and aboard . In January 1917, he joined the Royal Navy Reserve as a midshipman, and then entered the Royal Navy.

Naval career
He was appointed Fleet Navigating Officer, for the China Station in 1938. He served in the Second World War as Commanding Officer of the destroyers  and  HMS Salisbury and then as Naval Assistant Secretary to the War Cabinet from 1941 to 1943. In the closing stages of the war he commanded the cruiser .

After the war Clifford became Chief of Staff in Hong Kong and then was given command of the Navigation School in 1947. He went on to command the aircraft carrier  in 1949 before becoming Assistant Chief of the Naval Staff in 1951 and Flag Officer commanding the 5th Cruiser Squadron and Flag Officer Second in Command Far East Fleet in 1952. In the latter role he saw action during the Korean War. He was made Deputy Chief of the Naval Staff and a Lord Commissioner of the Admiralty in 1954; he retired in 1957.

References

1900 births
Military personnel from Sussex
1964 deaths
Commanders of the Order of the British Empire
Knights Commander of the Order of the Bath
Lords of the Admiralty
People from Hove
Royal Navy vice admirals
Royal Navy personnel of the Korean War
Royal Navy personnel of World War I
Royal Navy personnel of World War II